The Asheville Citizen-Times is an American, English language daily newspaper of Asheville, North Carolina. It was formed in 1991 as a result of a merger of the morning Asheville Citizen and the afternoon Asheville Times. It is owned by Gannett.

History

Founded in 1870 as a weekly, the Citizen became a daily newspaper in 1885. Writers Thomas Wolfe, O. Henry, both buried in Asheville, and F. Scott Fitzgerald, a common visitor to Asheville, frequently could be found in the newsroom in earlier days. In 1930 the Citizen came under common ownership with the Times, which was first established in 1896 as the Asheville Gazette. The latter paper merged with a short-lived rival, the Asheville Evening News, to form the Asheville Gazette-News and was renamed The Asheville Times by new owner Charles A. Webb.

The Citizen was in a former YMCA and the press was in the swimming pool. The Times was in the Jackson Building. The Citizen had to leave shortly after Christmas 1938 and publisher D. Hiden Ramsey asked Tony Lord to design a new building, which went up in 15 months at 14 O. Henry Avenue and also housed the Times. Charles Webb became president of both papers and the local radio station located on top of the building.

In 1954, the Citizen-Times Publishing Company which owned the newspapers and radio station WWNC was purchased by the Greenville News-Piedmont Company. In 1968 Greenville News-Piedmont merged with Southern Broadcasting Corporation to form Multimedia.

In 1986, $12 million was invested in offset printing presses and a new  production building in nearby Enka, with composed pages transmitted electronically from the downtown Asheville building located nine miles (14 km) away. In 1995, Multimedia was acquired by Gannett. In April 1997, the Citizen-Times became the first daily newspaper in Western North Carolina to launch a website; the site now receives tens of thousands of hits a day.

In Jan 2009, the press was shut down and shortly after sold off as scrap metal. Now the Citizen-Times is printed in Greenville, South Carolina, alongside The Greenville News and shipped to a distribution center.

See also
 List of newspapers in North Carolina

References

External links
 Citizen-Times official site
Official mobile website
 Asheville Citizen-Times article on AshevilleNow.com
 Other Newspapers and Publications in Asheville
Issues of the Asheville Citizen from 1885-1889, and from 1890-1900 from the Library of Congress.

Mass media in Asheville, North Carolina
Gannett publications
Daily newspapers published in North Carolina
1870 establishments in North Carolina